The Kho or Chitrali people, are an Indo-Aryan ethnolinguistic group native to the Chitral District of Khyber Pakhtunkhwa and Ghizer District of Gilgit-Baltistan. They speak an Indo-Aryan language called Khowar.

History
The Kho people are likely descendants of those who migrated to their present location in Chitral from the south. In ancient times the Kho people practiced a faith akin to that observed by the Kalash today. In the 14th century, many of the Kho converted to Islam though some previous customs continue to persist. With respect to Islam, the Kho are primarily Hanafi Sunni Muslims although there exists a substantial population of Ismaili Muslims in the Upper Chitral region.

Language
The Kho people speak the Khowar language, which is an Indo-Aryan language of the Dardic subgroup. The ethnologists Karl Jettmar and Lennart Edelberg noted, with respect to the Khowar language, that: "Khowar, in many respects [is] the most archaic of all modern Indian languages, retaining a great part of Sanskrit case inflexion, and retaining many words in a nearly Sanskritic form.”

Khowar is spoken by about 313,000 people in Pakistan. Most of the Kho people also use Urdu as a second language.

Culture
Kho culture places heavy emphasis on poetry, song and dance. Kho people also have a great respect of law and order. Much of this can be attributed to Chitral being a stable kingdom for most of its history, where the rule of law and the will of the ruler came before tribal concepts such as revenge and isolationism. Many Kho believe that their customs and language is much more rich, polite, and sophisticated in comparison to their neighbours.

Polo is a popular sport and pastime for the Kho people. Polo traditionally played by the Kho has little rules or organisation.

Dance and music play a large role in Kho society. Common clothing include the salwar kameez (long tunic and trousers) and headwear includes the pakol (chitrali hat).

Folk music 

Folk singers and reed instrument players have a special respect in the Kho society and are featured in their festivities. The most common instruments are Surnai Shehnai, Sitar, and reed instruments. The Kho sitar is a popular musical instrument in Chitral. It is made out of mulberry wood with five steel strings arranged in three courses, the outer ones have double strings, tuned in unison, while the inner course is single. Popular music of the area includes:
 Shishtoo-war (Sauz), a popular folk music played with shehnai on happy occasions, mostly at marriages.
 Shab-daraaz (Dani) is a sad tone based on heartbroken love poems.
 Ghalhwar is a combination of Dani and Sauz. This is a mixture of fast and classical music played at the starting of a polo match.

Genetics
According to Aziz et al. 2019, the western Eurasian mtDNA haplogroups were observed predominantly and mostly shared in Kho samples with overall frequency of 50%. These include HV8, H19, H57, H24, C and, C4a haplogroups. The South Asian haplogroups and its relevant subgroups including U4, U4c, U6, U5a, and W were also found in Kho samples with overall 37.5% frequency.  Another South Asian haplogroup, M30 was also identified for Kho samples with frequency of 6.2%. The haplogroups and haplotypes specify the origin and linkages of an individual and population. The mtDNA haplogroup analysis eventually demonstrates the western Eurasian ancestral origin of Kho samples. However, the presence of few South Asian haplogroups with a minor proportion revealed that Kho might be an admixed population of south and western Asian genetic components. This indicates the genetic affiliation of Kho with the South Asian populations.

Notable people 

 Saleem Khan

See also
 Chitral

References

External links
 chitraltoday.net

Social groups of Gilgit Baltistan
Social groups of Khyber Pakhtunkhwa
Dardic peoples
Chitral District